John Kerdiff,  DD (died 1671) was an Anglican priest in Ireland during the 17th century.

Kerdiffe was educated at Trinity College, Dublin. He held incumbencies at Desertcreat and Navan He was Dean of Clonmacnoise from 1661 to 1668.

References

Alumni of Trinity College Dublin
Deans of Clonmacnoise
17th-century Irish Anglican priests
1671 deaths
Year of birth missing